Anna Johanna Maria "Annita" van Iersel (born 5 October 1948), known as Annita Keating from 1975 to 1998, is a Dutch-born Australian artist and former wife of Paul Keating, former Prime Minister of Australia.

Early life
Born in Oisterwijk, North Brabant, Netherlands, she studied languages in Paris and London. She worked at KLM and Alitalia as a flight attendant.

Marriage
While working with Alitalia, she met Paul Keating, then an aspiring young politician. They married on 17 January 1975. Her parents later joined her in Australia.

While her husband was prime minister (from 1991 to 1996), their four children spent part of their teenage years at The Lodge, the prime minister's official residence in Canberra. Van Iersel was well travelled, and this, along with her knowledge of five languages, proved a valuable diplomatic asset, especially in support of Sydney's bid for the Sydney 2000 Olympic Games.

Art career
In 1998, Annita and Paul Keating separated. That same year she enrolled in a Master of Fine Arts course, majoring in photography, at the Australian National School of Arts in Darlinghurst, Sydney. She graduated in 2001. In March 2008 she was scheduled to exhibit a series of paintings – oils on Belgian linen – that she created in her studio on the Hawkesbury River.

They did not formally divorce until 2008, though she had resumed her maiden name of van Iersel long before then. Van Iersel revealed some years after the event, in an interview with her by The Bulletin, that Keating had broken off the relationship, not she, and had done it at a dinner party with friends.

References

1948 births
Living people
Australian painters
Australian women painters
Iersel, Annita Van
Flight attendants
Iersel, Annita Van
Artists from Sydney
Spouses of prime ministers of Australia
National Art School alumni
20th-century Australian women artists
20th-century Australian artists
21st-century Australian women artists
21st-century Australian artists